David Tomatis (born 3 February 1962) is a Monegasque bobsledder. He competed in the four man event at the 1992 Winter Olympics. In 2010, Tomatis became the Executive Director of the Fédération Monégasque de Bobsleigh.

References

External links
 

1962 births
Living people
Monegasque male bobsledders
Olympic bobsledders of Monaco
Bobsledders at the 1992 Winter Olympics
Bobsledders at the 1994 Winter Olympics
People from Mambéré-Kadéï